Lucie Lukačovičová (born 1980 in Prague, Czech Republic) is a Czech fantasy and science-fiction writer. She studied cultural anthropology and librarianship at Charles University. She teaches creative writing and works as a pedagogue of free-time, organizing activities for children and young adults.

She was the editor of six anthologies of young authors (starting with Stíny věcí – Shadows of Things in 2005) and translator from English (L.K. Hamilton: Guilty Pleasures, The Laughing Corpse, Circus of the Damned).

She received the Award of Karel Čapek twice, in 2001 and 2007.

She received the Encouragement Award 2007 of the European Science Fiction Society.

She published nearly one hundred short-stories and many articles, three novels in collaboration with other authors (Město přízraků – The City of Wraiths; Tajná kniha Šerosvitu – The Secret Book of Chiaroscuro; Cesta Rudé tanečnice – The Voyage of the Red Dancer) and three novels (Toki no shujin: Vládci času – Toki no shujin: Masters of Time; Stanice Armida – Station Armida; Detektivní kancelář Sirius – Private Eye Agency Sirius).

She frequently co-writes with her sister, Petra Lukačovičová.

References

External links
 interview with Lucie Lukačovičová for server fantasya.cz (in Czech)
 profile on server Legie (in Czech)
 author's profile, online bookshop Daemon (in Czech)
 author's profile, publishing company 'Straky na vrbě' (in Czech)
 Web Scifibase (in Czech)
 A short-story CatNIP published in 2015 in Romanian in the magazine Fantastica.
 Interview at Europa SF - The European Speculative Fiction portal

Czech science fiction writers
1980 births
Living people
Charles University alumni